XAM, or the eXtensible Access Method, is a storage standard developed and maintained by the Storage Networking Industry Association (SNIA). It is in the process of being ratified as an ANSI standard. XAM is an API for fixed content aware storage devices. XAM replaces the various proprietary interfaces that have been used for this purpose in the past. Content generating applications now have a standard means of saving and finding their content across a broad array of storage devices.

XAM is similar in function to a file system API such as the POSIX file and directory operations, in that it allows applications to store and retrieve their data. XAM stores application data in XSet objects that also contain metadata.

Basic concepts
The standard XAM API consists of all of the three primary objects and two secondary objects that an application can manipulate to store and retrieve data.

The first primary object that applications deal with to store and retrieve data is called an Xset. It is the object that is the container for both the data and the associated metadata. XSet metadata goes beyond the typical system metadata, and adds fields for retention and other data management policies. Applications can also add their own user metadata as well. This is a key requirement in the fixed content storage market. Any of the metadata in the XSet can be queried for later, in order to find the XSet.

XAM also has the notion of a system that will contain the XSets. This abstracted storage system is called an XSystem. The XSystem object is also the factory for XSet objects (via create and open methods). Any given application may have access to any number of XSystem storage devices, so there is a need to create XSystem objects for each system we need to access. This is done through an object called the XAMLibrary. The XAM Library manages all the connections to the storage devices and acts as a factory for XSystem objects.

See also
 Content-addressable storage

References

External links
 XAM Initiative – Provides good material both at the overview and detail level
 XAM SDK download – An open source reference implementation of the API
 XAM Developers Group – Provides information to assist developers working with XAM

Computer standards
Computer storage technologies